Jonathan Magagula (born 8 August 1954) is a Swazi boxer. He competed in the men's featherweight event at the 1984 Summer Olympics.

References

1954 births
Living people
Swazi male boxers
Olympic boxers of Eswatini
Boxers at the 1984 Summer Olympics
Commonwealth Games competitors for Eswatini
Boxers at the 1978 Commonwealth Games
Place of birth missing (living people)
Featherweight boxers